List of defunct automated train systems of automation grades from GoA1 to GoA4.

Notes

References

Lists of railway lines
Public transport
Rail infrastructure